John Depeden (died 1460) was a Canon of Windsor from 1430 to 1460.

Career

He was appointed:
Treasurer of St George's Chapel, Windsor Castle 1440
Prebendary of Wisborough in Chichester 1441 - 1460
Rector of Denham 
Prebendary of Torleton in Salisbury 1443 - 1457
Registrar of the Order of the Garter 1445

He was appointed to the sixth stall in St George's Chapel, Windsor Castle in 1430 and held the canonry until 1460.

Notes 

1460 deaths
Canons of Windsor
Registrars of the Order of the Garter
Year of birth unknown